Bruno Yizek (born December 10, 1948) is a Canadian wheelchair curler and Paralympian.

He competed with the Canadian team at the 2010 Paralympic Games in Vancouver, Canada, where they took the gold medal. He also took gold at the 2011 World Wheelchair Curling Championship in Prague, Czech Republic.

References

External links 
 

Profile at the Official Website for the 2010 Winter Paralympics in Vancouver

1948 births
Living people
Canadian male curlers
Canadian wheelchair curlers
Paralympic wheelchair curlers of Canada
Wheelchair curlers at the 2010 Winter Paralympics
Paralympic gold medalists for Canada
Medalists at the 2010 Winter Paralympics
World wheelchair curling champions
Place of birth missing (living people)
Paralympic medalists in wheelchair curling
Canadian wheelchair curling champions